Kelapa Gading Bikers is an Indonesian UCI Continental cycling team focusing on road bicycle racing. The team is an extension of the cycling club by the same name which was established in 1993.

Team roster

Major wins
2018
  National Time Trial Championships M35–39, Roy Aldrie Widhijanto

National champions
2018
  Indonesian M35–39 National Time Trial Championships, Roy Aldrie Widhijanto

References

External links

Cycling teams based in Indonesia
UCI Continental Teams (Asia)